Baron Pierre de Caters (25 December 1875, in Berchem – 21 March 1944, in Paris) was a Belgian adventurer, aviator and car and motorboat racer. In 1908, he was the first Belgian to fly an aircraft.

He was also the first Belgian to receive a pilot's license from the Belgian air club on 2 December 1909 and received a gold medal for the first kilometer in the same year. He was the first aircraft manufacturer in Belgium and the first instructor of military aviation. He also took part in car and motorboat races in Belgium and France.

In World War I he joined Belgian military aviation, commanding the flying school of Étampes.

Journey to India
On 16 November 1910, de Caters embarked to India with two Aviator airplanes. He was accompanied by Jules Tyck, another Belgian pilot.

The city of Bombay refused the organization of an aviation meeting. Then the two airmen traveled to Calcutta with their aircraft crated. In Calcutta, de Caters flew several times from the Club of Tollygunge. On 21 December, he flew for 27 minutes with Mrs. Sen Beil, sister of the Maharaja of Cooch Behar as passenger. One of the Aviators was damaged by fire. On 2 February 1911, de Caters and Tyck flew in Bangalore. They were received by the Maharaja of Mysore. From 16–18 February, Pierre flew from Secunderabad in the Hyderabad state. The Indian tour was completed and Pierre de Caters returned to Europe. A little later Aviator was dissolved and the baron would not take part in competitions any more.

See also
1906 Targa Florio

References

External links
Brussels Air Museum Restoration Society (BAMRS)
Brussels Air Museum Foundation
Brussels Air Museum Foundation
Biography on Amazon
EarlyAviators ; Baron de Caters

1875 births
1944 deaths
History of aviation
Belgian motorboat racers
Land speed record people
People from Berchem